Derk Mah Shuri (also Romanized as Derk Māh Shūrī) is a village in Balyan Rural District, in the Central District of Kazerun County, Fars Province, Iran. At the 2006 census, its population was 41, in 8 families.

References 

Populated places in Kazerun County